Geraldo José Rodrigues Alckmin Filho (born 7 November 1952) is a Brazilian politician who has served as the 26th vice president of Brazil since 1 January 2023. He previously served as the Governor of São Paulo from 2001 to 2006, and then again from 2011 to 2018, the longest term served in that state since the end of the Military dictatorship in Brazil. He was the Brazilian Social Democracy Party (PSDB) presidential nominee for the 2018 Brazilian presidential election, when he finished in fourth place, as well for the 2006 Brazilian presidential election, when he came in second place, losing in the runoff to then president Luiz Inácio Lula da Silva. 

Alckmin attended the Universidade de Taubaté's medical school, specializing in anesthesiology, before going on to work in the São Paulo Public Service Hospital. Alckmin was elected governor of São Paulo in 2010 and reelected in 2014, for the fourth (not consecutive) time. He resigned on 6 April 2018 to run for president for a second time in the 2018 elections. His vice governor Márcio França held the office until the end of the term on 1 January 2019. In 2021, Alckmin left PSDB after 33 years with the party and joined the Brazilian Socialist Party (PSB) the following year to be Lula's running mate in the 2022 Brazilian presidential election. On 30 October 2022, Lula beat Bolsonaro in the presidential election, making Alckmin vice president-elect. Alckmin is usually described by political analysts and supporters as a pro-business centrist, closely associated with the political and financial establishment.

Biography
Geraldo José Rodrigues Alckmin Filho was born in the city of Pindamonhangaba, Vale do Paraíba. Alckmin is the son of Geraldo José Rodrigues Alckmin and Míriam Penteado. Geraldo is the nephew of José Geraldo Rodrigues de Alckmin, who was a minister of the Supreme Federal Court. According to Época magazine, Geraldo received a Christian formation from the Opus Dei Catholic prelature, and told the magazine that his uncle José Geraldo was from Opus Dei.

Geraldo is married to Maria Lúcia Ribeiro Alckmin and is the father of three children. Sophia, Geraldo and Thomaz. Thomaz died in a helicopter accident on 2 April 2015.

Political career

While still in his first year of medical school, Alckmin began his political career in 1972 when he was elected to the Pindamonhangaba city council (1973–1977), and then its mayor (1977–1982). At age 25, he was the youngest Brazilian mayor. He was elected a federal deputy for two terms, (1983–1987 and 1987–1994), distinguishing himself by authoring consumer protection laws. In 1988, he was one of the founders of the Brazilian Social Democracy Party (PSDB).

He was elected vice governor of São Paulo, Mário Covas's running-mate first in the 1994 election and then again in 1998. With the death of Covas, he assumed the governorship of the state of São Paulo in March, 2001, he continued Covas' policies, investing in large, state-run projects, health and education programs. All of these investments were possible through   privatization programs that sold off public and state-owned companies. He was elected governor on October 27, 2002, through a runoff election, for the 2003–2006 term, with 12 million votes (or 58.64%). His current administration is marked by a reduction in the state payroll from 49% to 46% of the state's budget, the unification of purchasing systems and other "smart spending" initiatives, as well as the implementation of Public-Private Partnerships (PPPs).

2006 presidential election

On March 14, 2006, PSDB nominated Alckmin as its candidate for president in the 2006 elections. Because of electoral rules, no candidate running for office may currently be in an executive office, forcing him to resign the governorship on March 31, 2006. Cláudio Lembo, the lieutenant governor, finished Alckmin's term. Alckmin's party mate, José Serra, the PSDB's presidential standard-bearer who lost to Luiz Inácio Lula da Silva in 2002, then announced his candidacy to replace Alckmin in the 2006 state elections. Serra won the vote in Brazil's first round elections on October 1, 2006 and was elected as the governor of São Paulo.

Contrary to all major polls taken in the run-up to the October 1, 2006 balloting, Alckmin surprised almost everyone and came in second place in the presidential election. His 41.64% of the vote, along with votes cast for two less significant candidates, as well as ballots that were left blank or spoiled, was enough to deny the simple majority necessary to re-elect incumbent President Luiz Inácio Lula da Silva ("Lula") in the first round. Lula and Alckmin faced one another in a run-off election on October 29, 2006. Alckmin received 39% of the vote, losing to Lula, who received 61% of the vote and was then reelected.

Return to São Paulo
On January 19, 2009, Geraldo was appointed Secretary of Development for the State of São Paulo by then-Governor José Serra.

Governor of São Paulo; 2011–2018

State elections, 2010
At the PSDB Convention held on June 13, 2010, Alckmin was officially named the party's candidate for the São Paulo government.

Alckmin was elected governor in the first round with 11.5 million votes (50.63%) defeating Senator Aloizio Mercadante (PT) who obtained 8 million votes (35.23%).

Third term as governor, 2011–2014
Alckmin assumed the government of São Paulo for the third time on January 1, 2011. The inauguration took place during a ceremony held at State Legislative Assembly.

His administration in 2013 faces strikes in education and health. After the readjustment in the passage of the metropolitan trains and the subway, great manifestations of protests began, that also happened in all Brazil. The readjustment was later suspended by Alckmin and the mayor of São Paulo, Fernando Haddad.

Alckmin's reelection campaign for 2014 was officialized on June 29, 2014. In the first round, on October 5, 2014, he was re-elected with 12.2 million votes (57.31%), being the second highest percentage of votes since the redemocratization of Brazil.

Fourth term as governor, 2015–2018
Alckmin took office for the fourth time as governor of São Paulo on January 1, 2015.

2018 presidential campaign

In a convention held on 9 December 2017, Alckmin was elected the PSDB's national president in a 470–3 vote, succeeding Minas Gerais senator Aécio Neves, and announced his pre-candidacy for next year's presidential race. On 23 February 2018, after Manaus mayor Arthur Virgílio Neto suspended his campaign, Alckmin became the sole candidate for the party's primary. His candidacy became official on 6 March 2018.

Since resigning as governor and losing his legal immunity, Alckmin has been the target of a probe by electoral justice authorities for allegations that construction company Odebrecht illegally funneled R$10 million into his 2010 and 2014 campaign. He has denied wrongdoing, saying the funds were of "electoral nature" and that the allegation "does not proceed".

In early May 2018, Alckmin announced his campaign communications team, which is headed by Luis Felipe d'Avila with Lula Guimarães as marketing director. Later that month, he announced his economic advisorial team, which includes Plano Real economists Edmar Bacha and Persio Arida. In late July, Alckmin negotiated a coalition with the "centrão" (big centre), a group of parties in Congress composed of DEM, PP, PR, PRB and SD. On 2 August 2018, Rio Grande do Sul senator Ana Amélia Lemos, a member of PP, was confirmed as Alckmin's running mate in the general election. As the candidate with the largest coalition, Alckmin has secured the longest slot for political ads on free-to-air television channels.

As candidate, Alckmin has proposed a smaller government and reduction of taxes, and has defended the labor reform that took place in the administration of President Michel Temer.

On December 9, 2017, Alckmin stated that: “After having broken Brazil, Lula says he wants to return to power, that is, he wants to return to the scene of the crime. We will defeat him at the polls. Lula will be condemned at the polls by the biggest recession in history”(...) , and on May 7, 2022 Alckmin and Lula officialized the Lula-Alckmin ticket.

2022 presidential election 

After his defeat in the 2018 elections, Alckmin considered running again for São Paulo governor in 2022. His former ally, São Paulo governor João Doria, launched his vice governor Rodrigo Garcia as the PSDB's candidate for the role. Alckmin considered staying with the PSDB in the case of Eduardo Leite's victory against Doria in the party's presidential primaries. After Doria's victory in November 2021, Alckmin's departure from the party became inevitable.

On December 15, 2021, Alckmin formally announced his departure from the PSDB. After his departure, there were speculations that he would join the Social Democratic Party (PSD) if he decided to run for the government of São Paulo in 2022, or the leftist Brazilian Socialist Party (PSB) if he decided to run for vice president on former president Luiz Inácio Lula da Silva's ticket in the 2022 presidential elections. On July 29, he officially affiliated with the PSB and launched his candidacy for vice-presidency was officialized.

Alckmin's candidacy as vice-president for his former rival, Lula da Silva, has been seen as an attempt by Lula to form a broad front against the re-election of Jair Bolsonaro.

The Lula-Alckmin ticket won the second round of the 2022 elections, on October 30, defeating the ticket of incumbent President Jair Bolsonaro (PL). Alckmin will take the office of Hamilton Mourão (Republicans).

Vice President of Brazil
In March 2022, Alckmin joined PSB to be Lula's running mate in the 2022 presidential election. The two were formerly rivals in the 2006 Brazilian presidential election, where Alckmin, then a PSDB member, was defeated by Lula in the second round.

Ministry of Development, Industry and Foreign Trade 
In 22 December 2022, Alckmin was announced as the minister of Development, Industry and Foreign Trade on the second presidency of Lula da Silva.

Following the election of Luiz Inácio Lula da Silva as President of Brazil, Alckmin assumed office as vice president of Brazil on January 1, 2023.

Electoral history

References

External links

 Geraldo 45 - unofficial website

|-

|-

|-

|-

|-

|-

|-

|-

|-

|-

|-

|-

|-

1952 births
20th-century Brazilian physicians
Brazilian anesthesiologists
Brazilian Roman Catholics
Brazilian Democratic Movement politicians
Brazilian Social Democracy Party politicians
Brazilian Socialist Party politicians
Candidates for President of Brazil
Governors of São Paulo (state)
Vice Governors of São Paulo (state)
Members of the Chamber of Deputies (Brazil) from São Paulo
Members of the Legislative Assembly of São Paulo
Candidates for Vice President of Brazil
Living people
People from Pindamonhangaba
Brazilian people of Lebanese descent
Government ministers of Brazil
Vice presidents of Brazil